Avare En Deivam is a 1969 Indian Tamil-language film directed by C. N. Shanmugam, and produced by R. M. Muthiah and A. Veerappan. The film stars Gemini Ganesh, Muthuraman, Vijayakumari and Rajasree. It was released on 10 May 1969.

Plot

Cast 

Male cast
 Gemini Ganesh
 Muthuraman
 Nagesh
 V. S. Raghavan
 Mali
 Seshadri
 R. M. Somasundaram
 R. M. Meiyappan

Female cast
 Vijayakumari
 Rajasree
 S. Varalakshmi
 Bhanumathi
 Sivagami
 Baby Sumathi

Production 
Avare En Deivam was directed by C. N. Shanmugam, who also wrote the story and the dialogues were written by Balamurugan. The film was produced by R. M. Muthiah and A. Veerappan under Meenakshi Sundareswar Films. Cinematography was handled by Vindhanji, and editing by A. Govindaswami.

Soundtrack 
The soundtrack was composed by R. Parthasarathy, with lyrics by Kannadasan.

Release and reception 
Avare En Deivam was released on 10 May 1969. The Indian Express wrote on 17 May, "The film meanders with so many things to say that it was like trying to tell the story of everyone come to board a train on a railway platform. Most of the scenes lack conviction. The film is too long and lacks emphasis." T. M. Ramachandran of Film World took notice of numerous sex scenes in the film.

References

External links 
 

1960s Tamil-language films